The 2016 Bowling Green Falcons football team represented Bowling Green State University in the 2016 NCAA Division I FBS football season. The Falcons played their home games at Doyt Perry Stadium. They were led by first-year head coach Mike Jinks, and were members of the East Division of the Mid-American Conference. They finished the season 4–8, 3–5 in MAC play to finish in a tie for third place in the East Division.

Schedule

Schedule Source:

Game summaries

at Ohio State

North Dakota

Middle Tennessee

at Memphis

Eastern Michigan

at Ohio

at Toledo

Miami (Ohio)

at Northern Illinois

at Akron

Kent State

Buffalo

References

Bowling Green
Bowling Green Falcons football seasons
Bowling Green Falcons football